A. V. Ramanan (Aravamudan Venkata Ramanan) is a Tamil television host, singer and an actor. He became a household name in Tamil Nadu during his hosting of the famous Sun TV program Saptha Swarangal. He is married to playback singer Uma Ramanan.

Filmography

Actor
Kadhal Kadhal Kadhal (1980)
Chatriyan (1990) – Police Officer
Ennavale (2001) – Special appearance as Sapthaswarangal host
Boys (Tamil Film) (2003) – Siddharth's father
Madhurey (2004) – Officer Karthikeyan

Composer
Neerottam (1979)
Kadhal Kadhal Kadhal (1980)

Singer
Netroru Menagai – Manmadha Leelai
Mohana Kannan (with Uma Ramanan) – Sri Krishna Leela
En Chella Peru (with Suchitra) – Pokkiri
Oru Athukku – Rudra Thandavam

References

External links
 
 A V Ramanan's Musiano Website
 YouTube Channel

Living people
Male actors in Tamil cinema
Tamil film score composers
Tamil male actors
Tamil playback singers
Year of birth missing (living people)